Uncle Sam is an American brand of ready-to eat breakfast cereal that was first introduced in 1908 by U.S. Mills of Omaha, Nebraska. The company relocated to Needham, Massachusetts sometime after the 1970s. Attune Foods of San Francisco acquired Uncle Sam Cereal in 2009. In 2013 Post Foods acquired Attune Foods.

Uncle Sam Original cereal, since 1908 has consisted of toasted whole wheat berry kernels that are steamed, rolled and toasted into flakes. Whole flaxseed is then mixed with the flakes. This high-fiber, ready-to-eat cereal has a low glycemic index and has an exceptionally high amount of omega-3 per serving because of the flaxseed. It is marketed as a "natural laxative" because of the presence of flaxseed, though clinical support for this assertion is scant.

Because of its nutritional profile, Uncle Sam Cereal has been recommended by several well-known dietitians and nutritionists, as well as in top-selling diet books such as Rip Esselstyn's The Engine 2 Diet, Belly Fat Cure, Sugar Busters and the South Beach Diet.

Cereal contents

A 3/4 cup (60 grams) serving contains:  220 calories, 40 from fat; total fat 5 g; trans fat 0 g; cholesterol 0 mg; sodium 135 mg; potassium 250 mg; total carbohydrates 38 g; dietary fiber 10 g; soluble fiber 2 g; insoluble fiber 8 g; sugars less than 1 g.

It contains the following daily values: vitamin C 2%; calcium 4%; iron 10%; thiamin 50%; riboflavin 50%; niacin 50%; phosphorus 20%; magnesium 25%.

Ingredients:  whole wheat kernels, whole flaxseed, salt, barley malt, niacin, riboflavin (vitamin B2), thiamin mononitrate (vitamin B1).

References

External links
 

Post cereals
Products introduced in 1908